Yury (Georgy) Ilyich Vanyat  is one of the first and most respected sports journalists of the Soviet Union. The only journalist who covered all 54 Soviet Top League.

Career 
Played in the youth team goalkeeper Pishevik (Moscow). Graduated from high school coaches at the Institute of Physical Education. Covers all the Soviet Top League and hockey finals of the USSR Cup. Worked at 8 Olympic hockey tournament and 7 of the World Cup, 28 ice hockey world championships. Almost 40 years was a member of various committees of the Football Federation of the USSR, was a member of the National Olympic Committee of the USSR.

In 1933–1949 he worked in the newspaper Red Sports (since 1946 —  Soviet Sport). In 1950–1986 —  in the newspaper Trud. In 1987–1992 — the newspaper Moskovskaya Pravda.

Awards 
 Order of the Badge of Honour (1972)
 Order of Friendship of Peoples

References

External links 
 Sparks of publicity
 Gold medalist football journalism
 Sport necropolis

1913 births
1992 deaths
Journalists from Moscow
Recipients of the Order of Friendship of Peoples
Russian sports journalists
Soviet sports journalists